Boğuntu is a village in Anamur district of Mersin Province, Turkey. It is situated in a basin of the Taurus Mountains. The population of Boğuntu is 376 as of 2011.

References

Villages in Anamur District